Kim Leppänen (born 12. April 1989) is a Finnish sport shooter who won the 2015 IPSC Shotgun World Shoot Manual division title, and was part of the Finnish Manual National Team together with Jaakko Viitala, Ari Matero and Mikael Ekberg which placed first in the team classification.

See also 
 Josh Froelich, American sport shooter
 Roberto Vezzoli, Italian sport shooter

References 

IPSC shooters
Living people
1989 births